Escape from Mr. Lemoncello's Library is a 2017 science fiction film by Nickelodeon that is based on Chris Grabenstein's 2013 book of the same name. The film, was directed by Scott McAboy and produced by Amy Sydorick,  starring  Casey Simpson, Breanna Yde, Klarke Pipkin, A.J. Louis Rivera Jr., Ty Nicolas Consiglio, Katey Hoffman, and Russell Roberts.

Plot

Kyle Keeley (Casey Simpson) is an imaginative young boy who loves to solve puzzles created by famous game designer Mr. Luigi Lemoncello (Russell Roberts). One day, Lemoncello unveils his newest creation: a high tech library in which he selects twelve young children to solve puzzles and riddles and whoever gets out first will be the new spokesperson for all things Lemoncello.

The twelve are selected: Kyle, his adventurous best friend Akimi (Breanna Yde), bookworm Sierra (Klarke Pipkin), nerd Andrew Peckleman (A.J. Louis Rivera Jr.), bully Charles Chiltington (Ty Nicolas Consiglio), popular girl Haley Daley (Hayley Scherpenisse), Rose Vermette (Hannah Cheramy), Sean Keegan (Dylan Kingwell), Bridgette Wadge (Lily Killam), helpful Miguel Fernandez (Anantjot S. Aneja), over-eager Kayla Carson (Ombu Ance), and Yasmeen Smith-Snyder (Jenna Skodje).

Upon entering the library, Lemoncello and his assistant Dr. Zinchenko (Katey Hoffman) explain how difficult it is going to be and that they can use the devices they are given to opt out which opens a trap door that takes them out of the library. This causes Bridgette and Sean to forfeit and go home. Afterwards, the rules are explained and they are all given a library card which Kayla takes and hits causing her to be eliminated since she did not listen to the rules. After that, the challenge begins.

Upon solving the first clue, Chiltington reveals his sly and bullying self when he lies to Yasmeen causing her to be eliminated. Afterwards, they are given four rooms designed based on book genres: horror, fantasy, classic, and children. A holographic librarian named Ms. Tobin (Patti Allan) appears and explains the rules of entering the room including you can only enter each room once.

Miguel eagerly offers to enter the horror room to get the clue, but he soon becomes terrified by Count Dracula (Alexander Mandra) and Frankenstein's monster (John DeSantis) and opts out before he can reach The Tell-Tale Heart. Chiltington also gets Rose to opt out due to her own fear. Getting fed up with one another, the six remaining children divide into two teams: on one is Chiltington, Haley, and Andrew and on the other one is Kyle, Akimi, and Sierra. While Kyle's team enters the classic room where they had to ride flying books to solve a clue, Chiltington's team enters the children's section where Chiltington works to put Humpty Dumpty together while Peckleman meets Charlotte (Kari Wahlgren) from Charlotte's Web and Mother Goose. Both respective teams manage to receive their clues although Chiltington lies to everyone he forgot the clue in the children's section. This causes Haley to attempt to get it back, but is disqualified by Ms. Tobin for trying to go back inside: a rule which she did not listen to due to her doing selfies which Ms. Tobin is familiar with. She is sent down the trap door and is deposited outside as the crowd laughs at her. Lemoncello talks to Dr. Z about Chiltington's trickeries as Dr. Z leaves to go deal with a glitch involving Wilbur the Pig.

As Dr. Z makes her way to the scene of the glitch and runs into them, Chiltington and Peckleman state that they aren't cheating as Chiltington secretly takes a golden key which has power over the whole library. Kyle's team enters the fantasy section while Chiltington decides to cheat and gets Andrew to follow him into the section as well deciding to cheat and use them to get the clue which Andrew is uneasy about. The troll (Dana Snyder) from Three Billy Goats Gruff has them make out as many words from Lemoncello where the failure will have them be attacked by the giant from Jack and the Beanstalk. Kyle's team solves another riddle and receives a clue. While using the key to collapse the beanstalk and cause the Wicked Witch of the East (Breanna Watkins) to manifest, Chiltington however accidentally destroys the system releasing all the creatures including Count Dracula, Frankenstein's Monster, the troll, and a werewolf (Brin Alexander) into the library and wrecks havoc.

Lemoncello decides to go into the library and help the children. While Mother Goose is shown to have gone over to one of the library sections and brushed up on ninjitsu as mentioned by Charlotte, the kids were able to use the characters' weaknesses like water on the Wicked Witch of the East. Chiltington, regretting what he has done after he and Peckleman were attacked by Hansel and Gretel (Simon Pidgeon and Devyn Dalton) for eating their bread crumbs, also elects to help the team. The group escapes into the vents as they see the giant approaching the exit to the fantasy section.

Using dynamite, Lemoncello was able to put some distances between them and the pursuing Count Dracula, Frankenstein's monster, werewolf, and Hansel and Gretel. Making it to the exit, Ms. Tobin tells them how to activate it after she had fought off the troll. They all manage to restore order until a giant pterodactyl appears. The dinosaur was an idea created by Kyle and was released in the idea room when the children had previously entered. Instead of running in terror, Kyle faces his fear and fight off the dinosaur with red balloons he found after Lemoncello tells him not to blame himself for his idea, but embrace it as his own and defeat it using his bravery.

Lemoncello, Dr. Z, and the five remaining children exit the game and Lemoncello, impressed by their bravery and creative solutions, declare them all winners and thus spokespeople for his company. Dr. Z states to Lemoncello that she will need a vacation after this as well as getting the book characters back into their respective sections. Peckleman offers Chiltington his friendship and a ride home after having been previously told that Chiltington's parents could not be here due to work. Lemoncello offers Kyle a job as a summer librarian which he happily agrees to and then, Lemoncello presents Kyle his golden key to hold on to for safe keeping.

Cast
 Casey Simpson as Kyle Keeley, an imaginative young boy.
 Breanna Yde as Akimi Hughes, Kyle's adventurous best friend.
 Klarke Pipkin as Sierra Russell, a bookworm.
 A.J. Louis Rivera Jr. as Andrew Peckleman, a nerd.
 Ty Nicolas Consiglio as Charles Chiltington, a sly bully whose parents are always busy.
 Russell Roberts as Mr. Luigi Lemoncello, a famous game designer.
 Katey Hoffman as Dr. Yanina Zinchenko, the assistant of Mr. Lemoncello.
 Patti Allan as Mrs. Gail Tobin, a holographic librarian.
 Hayley Scherpenisse as Haley Daley, a popular girl.
 Sean Campbell as Mr. Keeley, Kyle's father.
 Tanya Champoux as Mrs. Keeley, Kyle's mother.
 Graham Verchere as Curtis Keeley, Kyle's brother.
 Samuel Braun as Mike Keeley, Kyle's brother.
 Hannah Cheramy as Rose Vermette, a competitor in Mr. Lemoncello's contest.
 Dylan Kingwell as Sean Keegan, a competitor in Mr. Lemoncello's contest who forfeits early.
 Lily Killam as Bridgette Wadge, a competitor in Mr. Lemoncello's contest who forfeits early.
 Anantjot S. Aneja as Miguel Fernandez, a helpful competitor in Mr. Lemoncello's contest.
 Ombu Ance as Kayla Carson, an over-eager competitor in Mr. Lemoncello's contest.
 Jena Skodje as Yasmeen Smith-Snyder, a competitor in Mr. Lemoncello's contest.
 Simon Pidgeon and Devyn Dalton as Hansel and Gretel, characters from their self-titled book that reside in the fantasy section of the library.
 Breanna Watkins as the Wicked Witch of the East, a villainous witch from The Wonderful Wizard of Oz who Chiltington uploads into the fantasy section of the library.
 John DeSantis as Frankenstein's monster, a character from Frankenstein who resides in the horror section of the library.
 Brin Alexander as Werewolf, a werewolf from an unknown story who resides in the horror section of the library.
 Alexander Mandra as Count Dracula, a vampire from Dracula who resides in the horror section of the library.

Voices
 Dana Snyder as the Troll, a character from Three Billy Goats Gruff who resides in the fantasy section of the library.
 Kari Wahlgren as Charlotte, a spider from Charlotte's Web who appears larger in the children's section of the library.

Production

Filming for this film was done in Vancouver, British Columbia, Canada.

References

External links
 Official website
 
 

2017 television films
2017 films
Nickelodeon original films